Ferdi Elmas (born 13 February 1985) is a Turkish former professional footballer who played as a winger.

Club career
Born in Amsterdam, Netherlands, Elmas played for Ajax for over nine years in his youth, having come through the ranks of the club's elite Youth Team. He continued his career in Dutch football after transferring to  RKC Waalwijk.

In 2004, he moved to Çaykur Rizespor, before completing a loan switch to Ankaraspor. During the summer transfer window of 2008, the Istanbul club Galatasaray signed the player on a three-year deal, expiring in June 2011. The transfer was a player-swap, with Uğur Akdemir being the player who left the team.

He was released by Galatasaray S.K. after a season after signing and signed a new deal with Turkish First Division team Karabükspor. In 2013, he was playing for FK Baku in the Azerbaijan Premier League.

Personal life
He qualifies for both Dutch and Turkish citizenship as his mother is Dutch and his father is Turkish.

Honours
Galatasaray
 Turkish Super Cup: 2008

References

MANİSA BÜYÜKŞEHİR’DEN İKİ TAKVİYE DAHA, 45haber.com, 7 January 2016

External links

1985 births
Living people
Dutch people of Turkish descent
Association football wingers
Association football midfielders
Turkish footballers
Turkey under-21 international footballers
Footballers from Amsterdam
Eredivisie players
Süper Lig players
Çaykur Rizespor footballers
Ankaraspor footballers
Galatasaray S.K. footballers
RKC Waalwijk players
Kardemir Karabükspor footballers
Karşıyaka S.K. footballers
FC Baku players
Gaziantep F.K. footballers
Manisa FK footballers
Expatriate footballers in Azerbaijan
Turkish expatriate sportspeople in Azerbaijan
Dutch expatriate sportspeople in Azerbaijan
TFF First League players
TFF Second League players
TFF Third League players
Azerbaijan Premier League players